Joseph Ades (18 December 1934 – 1 February 2009), also known as the "Gentleman Peeler", was a well-known street peeler seller in New York City, United States.

Early life
Joseph Ades, the youngest of seven children, was born in Manchester, England, to a Jewish family where his father worked in the textile industry. Leaving school at 15, he became an office boy before becoming intrigued by the local markets that would spring-up in the World War II–devastated landscapes of Northern England. He started out hawking comic books before selling linens, textiles, jewellery, and toys directly on the streets.

Australia
In 1956 he married Shirley, eventually having three children. The family moved to Australia in 1969 as Ten Pound Poms and settled in Sydney, where Ades tried to set up markets in the parking lots of drive-in movies. Eventually he sold goods at street fairs off of the back of a large truck. After his marriage to Shirley dissolved in 1980, Ades remarried and divorced again.

His third wife gave him a copy of London Labour and the London Poor by Henry Mayhew, a contemporary of Charles Dickens, which recorded the activities of the street sellers of the Victorian period. Ades modelled himself on sellers that Mayhew called "the patterers", most of whom liked to ape the dress and mannerisms of gentlemen.

New York City
After the break-up of his third marriage and a period of residence in Ireland, Ades followed his daughter to New York City, taking up residence in Manhattan.

From 1993 onward, Ades sold $5 Swiss-made metal potato peelers. His engaging sales patter and his $1,000 Chester Barrie suits and shirts from Turnbull & Asser made him a well-known character on his regular demo circuit, which included places such as the Union Square Greenmarket. Ades never obtained a license, meaning that he was often asked to move by the New York City Police Department. His iconoclastic pitches and lifestyle eventually brought him attention and notoriety, and he was the subject of a Vanity Fair article.

Ades sold enough peelers to enjoy café society at the Pierre Hotel, on the Upper East Side, and lived with his fourth wife, Estelle Pascoe in her three-bedroom apartment on Park Avenue.

Ades died on 1 February 2009, aged 74, only a day after being informed that he had been granted American citizenship.

Legacy
Ades was survived by his daughter and two sons from his first marriage. His daughter, Ruth Ades-Laurent, began selling the peelers in the same spots as her father, but was later forbidden from selling in Union Square.

References

External links
 A-Peeling To The Masses – New York Post video article on Joe Ades
 Impromptu video of Joe Ades (circa November 2008)
 RIP Joe Ades – Photos of Joe Ades

1934 births
2009 deaths
English emigrants to Australia
English expatriates in the United States
Performance art in New York City
People from Manchester
People from the Upper East Side
20th-century English businesspeople